Fanny Stollár (born 12 November 1998) is a Hungarian tennis player.

Stollár has won two doubles titles on the WTA Tour and one doubles title on the WTA Challenger Tour, as well as one singles title and twelve doubles titles on the ITF Women's Circuit. On 19 November 2018, she reached her best singles ranking of world No. 114. On 10 September 2018, she peaked at No. 67 in the WTA doubles rankings.

Playing for Hungary Fed Cup team, Stollár has a win–loss record of 7–2 (as of January 2023).

Career highlights
In 2015, Budapest-born Stollár won the Wimbledon girls' doubles title, partnering Dalma Gálfi.

She defeated sixth seed Johanna Konta in straight sets in the second round of the WTA Tour event of Charleston in April 2018. Stollar had played two qualifying matches and beaten Francesca Di Lorenzo in the first round.

Her biggest doubles title, so far, came at the 2018 Hungarian Ladies Open, where she together with Spanish player Georgina García Pérez defeated Kirsten Flipkens and Johanna Larsson in three sets.

She won her second doubles title also at the 2021 Budapest Grand Prix, partnering Mihaela Buzarnescu.

Personal life and background
Stollar started playing tennis aged three. She stated that her favorite surface is hardcourt.

Performance timelines

Only main-draw results in WTA Tour, Grand Slam tournaments, Fed Cup/Billie Jean King Cup and Olympic Games are included in win–loss records.

Singles
Current through the 2022 Wimbledon Championships.

Doubles

WTA career finals

Doubles: 5 (2 titles, 3 runner-ups)

WTA 125 tournament finals

Doubles: 1 (1 title)

ITF Circuit finals

Singles: 5 (1 title, 4 runner–ups)

Doubles: 14 (12 titles, 2 runner–ups)

Junior Grand Slam finals

Girls' doubles: 1 (1 title)

Notes

References

External links

 
 
 

1998 births
Living people
Olympic tennis players of Hungary
Tennis players from Budapest
Hungarian female tennis players
Wimbledon junior champions
Grand Slam (tennis) champions in girls' doubles
Tennis players at the 2014 Summer Youth Olympics
21st-century Hungarian women